Linde may refer to:

Places
Lindes and Ramsberg Mountain District, a former district in Sweden, see Lindesberg Municipality
Lipka, Złotów County, a village in Poland, called Linde before World War II

Rivers
Linde (Tollense), a river of Mecklenburg-Vorpommern, Germany
Linde (Lena), a river in Sakha Republic, Russia

Other uses
Linde (surname)
Linde plc, an international industrial gases company
Linde Hydraulics, a manufacturer of heavy duty drive systems
Mercedes-Benz Championship (European Tour), formerly the Linde German Masters, a professional golf tournament played in Germany

People 

 Fedor Linde, a russian revolutionary

See also 
Linde–Buzo–Gray algorithm, an algorithm in vector quantization to derive a good codebook
Lind (disambiguation)
Linden (disambiguation)
Lindner
Lindemann (Lindeman)